There are 11 biosphere reserves in Vietnam recognized by UNESCO, include:

 Cần Giờ Mangrove Forest, 2000
 Đồng Nai Biosphere Reserve (former Cat Tien, 2001 - extended in 2011)
 Cát Bà National Park, 2004
 Red River Delta Biosphere Reserve, 2004
 Kiên Giang Biosphere Reserve, 2006
 Western Nghệ An, 2007
 Mũi Cà Mau National Park, 2009
 Cu Lao Cham Marine Park, 2009
 Langbiang Biosphere Reserve, 2015
 Núi Chúa National Park, 2021
 Kon Hà Nừng Biosphere Reserve, 2021

See also

 List of World Heritage Sites in Vietnam
 World Network of Biosphere Reserves

References 

Geography of Vietnam
 
Biosphere reserves of Vietnam